The Battle of Helm's Deep, also called the Battle of the Hornburg, is a fictional battle in J. R. R. Tolkien's The Lord of the Rings that saw the total destruction of the forces of the Wizard Saruman by the army of Rohan, assisted by a forest of tree-like Huorns. 

Helm's Deep was a valley in the north-western White Mountains of Middle-earth. Helm's Deep, with its fortress the Hornburg, becomes the refuge of some of the army of Rohan, the Rohirrim, under King Théoden, from assault by the forces of Saruman. Although Théoden says that "the Hornburg has never fallen to assault," in the battle a massive army of Uruk-hai and Dunlendings sent by Saruman almost overwhelms the defences. Saruman's Orcs breach the fortress wall that blocks the valley by setting off an explosion in a culvert; Aragorn names it "Saruman's devilry" and "the fire of Orthanc"; the critic Tom Shippey calls it "a kind of gunpowder". The defenders hold out in the fortress until dawn, when Théoden and Aragorn lead a cavalry charge that drives the Orcs from the fortress. They are surprised to see the valley to the enemy's rear blocked by a forest of tree-like Huorns that have walked from Fangorn in the night. On the side of the valley are relieving forces assembled by Gandalf and Erkenbrand, a Rohirrim leader. These attack, driving the Orcs into the angry Huorn forest, from which the Orcs never emerge; the Huorns bury the Orcs's bodies in an earthen mound known as "Death's Down".

Peter Jackson's 2002 film The Two Towers makes the battle dramatic, following Tolkien's account quite closely, but with changes to the forces involved: the defenders include a group of Elf-warriors sent by Elrond (intended in a preliminary treatment to also feature Aragorn's love-interest Arwen in leadership as an Elf-warrior princess, but this did not test well in early screenings); the attackers do not include men or wargs (battle-wolves), and the original theatrical release did not include the Huorns, either; the Huorns, however, are included as additional scenes in the Extended Edition, later released on DVD. 

Tolkien based Helm's Deep on England's Cheddar Gorge, and the Glittering Caves of Aglarond on the cave complex that he had visited there.

Fictional geography

Helm's Deep is properly the narrow gorge or ravine at the head of a larger valley (the Deeping-coomb), but the name is also used for the fortifications at the mouth of the gorge and the larger valley below. The gorge, which wound deep into the White Mountains at the feet of the Thrihyrne mountain, led into the Glittering Caves of Aglarond, an extensive series of spectacular speleothems. In The Lord of the Rings, the Dwarf Gimli, who like all dwarves is well versed in geology, horrified that the caves are used only as a refuge, describes them lyrically as:

At one end of the wall the Hornburg castle stood on a spur of the mountain; a long stair led to its rear gate, and a long causeway led down forwards from its main gate. About two furlongs (400 metres) down from the gate was an outer trench and rampart, Helm's Dike, built right across the Deeping-coomb. Tolkien drew detailed sketches of the fortifications.

Description

Background

Théoden had been released by the Wizard Gandalf from the influence of Gríma Wormtongue, his malevolent adviser and Saruman's spy. He then set out to the Fords of Isen, where his marshal Erkenbrand was fighting Saruman's forces. However, Théoden found out that his forces had been scattered. Gandalf advised him to take refuge in the Hornburg fortress of Helm's Deep. Gandalf then left on an unexplained errand. Théoden's army went to the area, where local people were commanded by a captain called Gamling the Old. Many of the men there were very old or young. The women and children of Théoden's capital Edoras were safe in Dunharrow, led by the King's niece Éowyn.

The garrison of Helm's Deep consisted of some 1,000 men, but around 1,000 more defenders had arrived from across Rohan by the time of the battle. The enemy, Saruman's army, consisted of at least 10,000 Orcs and men, most marching from Isengard to Helm's Deep, and others heading to the Fords of Isen. An additional force of Men of Dunland joined the enemy.

The battle

The forces of Saruman, common Orcs, large Uruk-hai, "half-orcs and goblin-men", and Dunlendings (Men of Dunland),  arrived at Helm's Deep on a stormy night. They stormed the first defence, Helm's Dike, forcing the defenders to fall back to the fortress. They attempted to break down the gate with a battering ram, but a sortie led by Aragorn and Éomer briefly scattered the attackers.

The Orcs and Dunlendings raised ladders to scale the wall, but were held back by the Men of Rohan atop the wall. Orcs crept into the culvert and made a breach in the wall using a "blasting-fire" from Orthanc, perhaps "a kind of gunpowder"; Saruman's army rushed in. Some defenders retreated to the Glittering Caves of Aglarond, while others retreated to the Hornburg.

Saruman's forces broke through the Hornburg gate just before dawn. At this moment, Helm's horn was sounded, and Théoden and Aragorn rode out, followed by all the Rohirrim left inside. They cut their way through the Orcs and drove them back from the fortress walls to Helm's Dike.

As day dawned, both armies saw that a forest of angry, tree-like Huorns now filled the valley, trapping Saruman's army. Above them, Gandalf appeared on Shadowfax, with Erkenbrand and a thousand footsoldiers who had escaped from the Fords of Isen. They charged into the fray. The Dunlendings dropped their weapons, while the Orcs fled into the Huorn forest and were destroyed. 

Tolkien noted in a letter that he had created walking tree-creatures partly in response to his "bitter disappointment and disgust from schooldays with the shabby use made in Shakespeare's Macbeth of the coming of 'Great Birnam Wood to high Dunsinane hill': I longed to devise a setting in which the trees might really march to war". The Tolkien scholar Tom Shippey calls it a "shock" that the battle is decided in this way.

Aftermath

After the battle, the Dunlendings were given amnesty by Erkenbrand and allowed to return home (much to their surprise, since Saruman had told them that the men of Rohan would burn all survivors alive). The Rohirrim required that all hostilities cease, and that the Dunlendings retreat behind the River Isen again and never recross while bearing arms. Before they were freed, though, the Dunlending captives were put to work in repairing the fortress.

The bodies of the Orcs that had entered the forest of Huorns were never seen again; the Huorns had buried them in an earthen mound known as "Death's Down".

Among the Rohirrim dead was Háma, captain of Théoden's personal guard and doorward of his hall; the Orcs had hewn his corpse, an atrocity that Théoden recalled during his later parley with Saruman. Gimli had been wounded, but had killed 42 Orcs to Legolas's 41.

Literary history

In Book III, ch. 5 of The Two Towers, Helm is described only as a "hero of old wars"; Tolkien did not envision him as a king when he wrote that chapter.

Tolkien had not yet envisioned Helm's Deep in his first sketch for the decisive battle between Rohan and the forces of Saruman. In an outline published in The Treason of Isengard as “The Story Foreseen from Fangorn," the Rohirrim rode west at Gandalf's urging, as in the published text, but met the army of Saruman on the open plain. An indecisive battle ensued, after which the Rohirrim camped for the night, and woke to see the enemy surrounded and destroyed by a wood that had appeared overnight.

In a 1958 letter to Rhona Beare, one of a group of enthusiasts, Tolkien stated that the Rohirrim "were not 'Mediaeval' in our sense", but that all the same "the styles of the Bayeux Tapestry (made in England) fit them well enough", explaining that the soldiers in the tapestry are wearing chain-mail.

Later writings

After the publication of The Lord of the Rings, Tolkien wrote about the history of Rohan, in writings now collected by his son Christopher in Unfinished Tales. These state that the fortresses of Aglarond and Angrenost (renamed Isengard by the Rohirrim) were built by Gondor to guard the shoulders of the Gap of Rohan. Like Angrenost to the north, it was initially well guarded, but as the population of Calenardhon dwindled it was not maintained and was left to a hereditary small guard who intermarried with Dunlendings. When Cirion, Steward of Gondor, gave Calenardhon to the Éothéod, Aglarond was transferred into the care of the Rohirrim, who named it Súthburg ("South-fortress" in Old English). The Gondorian guard was merged with that of Isengard. Guard duty of the Fords was initially shared between Gondor and Rohan, but later maintained only by the Rohirrim.

Adaptations

Peter Jackson's film

In Peter Jackson's 2002 film The Two Towers the keep was built into the mountainside and resembles a World War I bunker, in keeping with Tolkien's history as a soldier in that war. The entrance to the Glittering Caves of Aglarond is within the Hornburg itself, rather than at the top of the deep behind the Deeping Wall as in the book. Further, the Uruk-hai assault the main gateway in a testudo, or locked-shields style formation, and the 'blasting fire' is depicted as gunpowder. The battle was filmed mainly at night, in frequent heavy natural rain or when necessary with artificial rain on the actors, for more than three months. The Helm's Deep set used some computer-generated imagery; some parts were constructed as full size sets; some shots used a 1/4 scale physical model, while more distant shots used a 1/85 scale model. In the final battle scene, Weta's "Massive" crowd simulation software and "Grunt" rendering software were used, with thousands of Uruk-hai modelled using Alias/Wavefront's "Maya" software. It has been described as one of the greatest battle scenes in film, combining "technical mastery, sweeping spectacle and tonal balance". In the film, 10,000 of Saruman's Uruk-hai (with no Orcs of other races, Dunlendings or wargs to accompany them) lay siege to the fortress, defended by around 300 Rohirrim. Soon after, however, a large group of the Elves of Lothlórien join the defences, sent by Elrond, at Galadriel's prompting. The defenders suffer heavy losses, but hold out until dawn, when Gandalf arrives with 2,000 riders led by Éomer, who turn the tide of the battle and rout Saruman's forces. In the original script of the film, Elrond and Arwen had gone to see Galadriel in person, and it was Arwen who led the Elves to fight alongside the Rohan defenders. Jackson rejected Arwen's involvement, revising her character from a "warrior princess" to a role closer to that of the book, but kept the Elves in the battle.

Other
 

The 2013 expansion to The Lord of the Rings Online entitled Helm's Deep depicts the fortress of Helm's Deep as well as the surrounding area of Western Rohan, the Battle of Helm's Deep featuring prominently.

See also

 Battle of the Pelennor Fields – the next battle, in which the Rohirrim ride to the rescue of Gondor
 Battle of the Morannon – the last battle of the Third Age, with a contingent of the Rohirrim

References

Primary

This list identifies each item's location in Tolkien's writings.

Secondary

Sources 
  
     
 
  
 
 
  
 

Fictional elements introduced in 1954
Fictional valleys
Middle-earth battles